The Castle of Lavaux-Sainte-Anne is a castle located in Wallonia  near Rochefort, Province of Namur in Belgium. In 1450, Jean II de Berlo commissioned the building of the castle.

On 16 November 2002, famous tennis player Justine Henin married Pierre-Yves Hardenne in this castle.

See also
List of castles in Belgium

External links

Château de Lavaux-Sainte-Anne website

Buildings and structures completed in 1450
Houses completed in the 15th century
Wallonia's Major Heritage
Historic house museums in Belgium
Castles in Belgium
Castles in Namur (province)
Chateau de Lavaux-Sainte-Anne
Chateau de Lavaux-Sainte-Anne
Water castles